Kate Glancy (born 25 March 1960) is a British-Canadian former professional tennis player.

Glancy, a left-handed player, moved to Canada in 1978 and was based in Abbotsford, British Columbia. She reached the final qualifying round at the 1978 Wimbledon Championships, while her best performances on the WTA Tour were second round appearances at both 1978 Brighton International and 1981 Japan Open.

References

External links
 
 

1960 births
Living people
British female tennis players
Canadian female tennis players
British emigrants to Canada
Sportspeople from Abbotsford, British Columbia
Racket sportspeople from British Columbia